Kapustinka is a rural locality (a settlement) in Proslaukhinsky Selsoviet, Bayevsky District, Altai Krai, Russia. The population was 40 as of 2013. There are 3 streets.

Geography 
Kapustinka is located near the Kulunda River 19 km northeast of Bayevo (the district's administrative centre) by road. Proslaukha is the nearest rural locality.

References 

Rural localities in Bayevsky District